Syndicate were a short lived Australian rock group. They released one studio album in 2011, which peaked at number 20 on the ARIA Charts. The group supported Alice Cooper, on his 2011 Australian tour.

History
Syndicate were made up of five musicians from Sydney. They signed with Sony Music, before travelling to Los Angeles to write and record their debut album. They recorded part of the album in Tommy Lee's home studio in Calabasas.
In 2011, lead singer Greg Agar, reflected saying, "The whole Los Angeles experience was incredible from day one. It was kind of weird having it sink in that we were in Hollywood recording an album but we spent every day in the studio working towards the goal."

On returning to Australia in late 2010, Syndicate released their debut single "Shout", which debuted at number 46 on the ARIA Charts with 3039 sales. The group released a second single "All My Life" in May 2011.

In July 2011, Syndicate released their debut self-titled album, which peaked at number 20 on the ARIA Charts. They supported the album with a national tour.

Discography

Albums

Charting singles

References

Musical groups from Sydney
2010 establishments in Australia
2011 disestablishments in Australia
Musical groups established in 2010
Musical groups disestablished in 2011